Emilio Salafia (10 October 1910 – 24 May 1969) was an Italian fencer. He won a silver medal in the team sabre event at the 1928 and 1932 Summer Olympics.

References

External links
 
 
 

1910 births
1969 deaths
Italian male fencers
Olympic fencers of Italy
Fencers at the 1928 Summer Olympics
Fencers at the 1932 Summer Olympics
Olympic silver medalists for Italy
Olympic medalists in fencing
Sportspeople from Palermo
Medalists at the 1928 Summer Olympics
Medalists at the 1932 Summer Olympics